Leśno may refer to the following places:
Leśno, Bytów County in Pomeranian Voivodeship (north Poland)
Leśno, Chojnice County in Pomeranian Voivodeship (north Poland)
Leśno, Wejherowo County in Pomeranian Voivodeship (north Poland)
Leśno, Leszczyński County